MLA Krishnapal Malik (born 8 September 1960) is an Indian politician and the MLA of Baraut, Uttar Pradesh from Bharatiya Janata Party. He has assets which value around 11 crores and by profession he is in to agriculture and business.

MLA Krishnapal Malik took a stand against the negligence in building Delhi Yamunotri highway which is still under construction and also wrote a letter to CM Yogi Adityanath mentioning the problems of the people travelling through the area faces, as well as mishaps that take place due to the broken and uneven road.

Political career 
He is the sitting MLA in the Uttar Pradesh Legislative Assembly from Baraut, Uttar pradesh.

References 

Bharatiya Janata Party politicians from Uttar Pradesh
Living people
Uttar Pradesh MLAs 2012–2017
Uttar Pradesh MLAs 2022–2027
People from Baghpat
1960 births